James Russell is an Australian comedian and actor, best known for appearing in the television series Comedy Inc.. He has also featured in Australian films, sitcoms and dramas.

Russell toured throughout Europe and North America during 2007 and 2008 with the  production of 'Soft'. In 2009 he played the title role in the Malthouse Theatre production of Goodbye Vaudeville Charlie Mudd.
In 2013, he portrayed the recurring character of Roland in the teen drama television series Nowhere Boys.

References

External links

Australian male television actors
Australian male comedians
Living people
Year of birth missing (living people)
Place of birth missing (living people)